The Triple Crown in professional snooker refers to the sport's three longest-running and most prestigious tournaments: the World Snooker Championship (first held in 1927 and staged as a knockout tournament continuously since 1969), the invitational Masters (held annually since 1975), and the UK Championship (held annually since 1977). Players who win all three tournaments over the course of their careers are said to have won the Triple Crown. In January 2020, these tournaments were formally named the Triple Crown Series, with any player who has won all three gaining the right to wear an embroidered crown on their waistcoat reflecting their achievement. 

As of 2023, eleven players have won a career Triple Crown: Steve Davis, Terry Griffiths, Stephen Hendry, Alex Higgins, John Higgins, Shaun Murphy, Ronnie O'Sullivan, Neil Robertson, Mark Selby, Judd Trump, and Mark Williams. O'Sullivan has won the most Triple Crown titles, with 21, while Hendry has won 18 and Davis 15. 

Only Davis, Hendry, and Williams have won all three Triple Crown events in a single season, with Hendry being the only player to accomplish this feat twice.

History
In 1969, the World Snooker Championship became a single elimination tournament, replacing the previous challenge format; this marks the start of the professional game's "modern era". Six years later, a non-ranking invitational event, the Masters, was introduced; there were 10 competitors in the inaugural Masters in 1975, which later increased to 16 players. John Spencer won the 1975 Masters tournament, becoming the first person to win two Triple Crown events, having won the world championships in 1969 and 1971. The following year, Ray Reardon won both the Masters and World Championship in the same season.

In 1977, the UK Championship was created. Originally restricted to British residents and passport holders, the tournament was opened to all professionals in 1984 and also became a ranking event. Patsy Fagan won the 1977 UK Championship, in his only Triple Crown final. In the 1980–81 season, Steve Davis won both the 1980 UK Championship and the 1981 World Snooker Championship, and was the first player to complete the career Triple Crown when he won the 1982 Masters the following season. Davis was also the first player to complete the season Triple Crown, winning all three events in the 1987–88 season.

The Triple Crown events are sometimes referred to as the "big three BBC events", due to them having been broadcast by the British Broadcasting Corporation since inception. They are also sometimes called "snooker's majors", or the "big three" events. However, some have questioned the status of the Triple Crown events, arguing the World Championship is snooker's only major tournament, with John Higgins describing the Tour Championship, first held in 2019, as "far bigger than the UK [Championship]".

Triple Crown events are considered the most prestigious snooker titles, and have historically offered the most prize money. However, in recent years, prize money for other events, such as the China Open has exceeded that of these events. From the 2020 Masters onward, players who have completed the Triple Crown are eligible to have a gold crown embroidered on their playing waistcoats in recognition of their achievement.

Career Triple Crown winners

Eleven players have completed a career Triple Crown: Steve Davis, Terry Griffiths, Alex Higgins, Stephen Hendry, John Higgins, Mark Williams, Ronnie O'Sullivan, Neil Robertson, Mark Selby, Shaun Murphy, and Judd Trump. Only Davis, Hendry and Williams have won all three Triple Crown events in the same season. Hendry is the only player to achieve the feat twice, in the 1989–90 and 1995–96 seasons.

After winning the 1999 Masters, John Higgins held all three Triple Crown titles at the same time but his victories spanned two seasons. Only O'Sullivan and Hendry have managed to successfully defend all three Triple Crown events. In 2013, Robertson became the first player from outside the United Kingdom to complete the career Triple Crown. Following his win in the 2018 UK Championship, O'Sullivan surpassed Hendry's previous record of 18 and now has won 21 Triple Crown titles. Trump is the most recent player to have achieved a career Triple Crown, winning the Masters and World Championship in the 2018–19 snooker season.

One win away from Triple Crown
Of those still active on the tour as of the 2022–23 season, five players have won two of the three events, leaving them one away from completing the career Triple Crown. Jimmy White, Matthew Stevens, Ding Junhui and Mark Allen all of whom have won the Masters and UK Championship at least once, need to win the World Championship to complete their Triple Crown. Stuart Bingham is yet to win the UK Championship, but does have a World Championship title and a Masters title to his name.

Former professional players Peter Ebdon, John Parrott, Ray Reardon, John Spencer, Dennis Taylor, Doug Mountjoy and Cliff Thorburn won two of the three events before retiring. Ebdon and Parrott won both the UK and World championships, with Parrott reaching the final of the Masters on three occasions between 1989 and 1992. Reardon, Spencer, Thorburn and Taylor won the World Championship and Masters titles during their careers, but not the UK Championship. Mountjoy was close to winning the World Championship in 1981, only to lose to Steve Davis in the final.

Tournament winners
A list of all winners of the three Triple Crown events is shown below by season:

See also
List of snooker players by number of ranking titles

References

Snooker tours and series
Snooker terminology
Lists of snooker players
Snooker professional competitions
World Snooker Championships
UK Championship (snooker)
Masters (snooker)